Mutant Night is an arcade platform shooter game released in 1987 by UPL. The player controls a small white creature named Mutron-kun. The creature has a large eye that the bubbles can be shot from.

These bubbles then kill the various and diverse enemies that attack, for example skeletal monkeys, space ships and spinning discs. Mutron-kun also has the ability to jump and remain floating for a period of time by the repeated pressing of the jump button.

Gameplay
Mutant Night is a shoot'em up game of the "run and gun" type. The player controls Mutron-kun who shoots at enemies while avoiding his attacks.
Unlike most run and gun games, Mutant Night has almost no platform part whatsoever and the character's shooting power is very limited. Short range and not multi-directional, the bubbles are always shot in the direction the character is facing.

The game is divided in various levels or acts and focuses on fast-paced action and memorization.
The levels are very short and straightforward, with a level design relying only on enemies attack patterns and on the game's physics to challenge the player.
Mutron-kun can walk left or right, shoot bubbles and jump, and hurries to reach a small trapdoor at the end of each level. The difficulty curve of the game increases significantly after the first level and can be somewhat unforgiving.

Power ups are available in the form of small pink pods on the grounds which, when shots release a colored orb into the air, can do of the following: make Mutron-kun very large and indestructible for the short period, transform Mutron-kun into multiple creatures, award extra points or grant increased fire power in a scatter shot pattern.

The size changing bonus is one of the most notable features of the game where the character grows into an invincible giant, destroying all enemies on its way. Similar bonuses appear in later games from various editors like Hudson Soft's Bonk 3: Bonk's Big Adventure (1993) for the TurboGrafx-16 or Nintendo's New Super Mario Bros. (2006) for the Nintendo DS.

Another notable feature is the "cumulative jump". By pressing the jump button multiple times while still in the air, Mutron-kun can chain several jumps, reach higher positions and float in the air. Doing so, Mutron-kun is however subject to a certain inertia which makes the controls more difficult than it should.
The game makes use of this feature by challenging the player to get the bonuses: colored orbs, released from the pink pods, immediately float away, forcing the player to jump higher to reach them.
If the "cumulative jump" ability is limited in the first three levels, it becomes unlimited in the fourth level, allowing Mutron-kun to literally walk in the air for as long as wanted.
In several of the following levels, the gameplay will make use of this feature: some levels have to be completed mostly air-walking, as touching the ground outside of a few safe spots means immediate death.
While there's no limitation in time when using "air walking", after a long walk in the air, Mutron-kun will need to rest for a few seconds after landing, making him very vulnerable to enemies attacks.

Legacy
Mutant Night was only available as an arcade game and was never ported to any other systems until 2017, when Hamster (the current rights owner of Nihon Bussan games) released it on the PlayStation 4 as part of their Arcade Archives series and in December 2021 on the Nintendo Switch.

Atomic Robo-Kid, another side scrolling shoot'em up game in 1988 by UPL, could be considered a sequel to Mutant Night as the two games have some similarities:
 Tsutomu Fuzisawa, the game's designer, created the character design in Mutant Night.
 The graphic atmospheres are very close, with one level in Atomic Robo-Kid even actually using graphics from a forest level from Mutant Night, only slightly enhanced.
 Levels are similarly named as "Act".
 Atomic Robo-Kid also borrows elements from the "run n gun" genre, starting with a main character who can only walk. Flying capacity must be acquired.
 The helping character "Mini Doragon" (name credited in Atomic Robo-Kid's ending credits) appears in both games.
 While the detail in Mutant Night was the animated remaining life icons, a miniature version of Mutron-kun is animated when a life is lost. The same idea is used in Atomic Robo-Kid.

References

External links

1987 video games
Arcade video games
Nintendo Switch games
PlayStation 4 games
Side-scrolling video games
Video games developed in Japan
Hamster Corporation games
Multiplayer and single-player video games
UPL Co., Ltd games